A half tower (sometimes half-tower), open tower, or open-gorged tower (Halbschalenturm or Schanzturm) is a fortified stone tower in an external wall or castle enceinte that is open, or only lightly constructed, at the rear. Towers of this type were used, for example, in city walls. City gates can also be incorporated into a type of half tower.

Description 

Unlike closed towers, which were fully enclosed by walls, half towers were open on the inside, typically the side facing the city or the inner bailey of a castle. On this side, a wooden railing on individual floors stopped people or objects from falling off. Sometimes the open side was sealed with wooden planking or weaker timber framed walls. Towers that are fully open at the top and rear are open towers, whilst those only open on the lower floors (i.e., the top floor is walled and roofed) are partially open towers.

Most half towers were semi-circular in plan, but some were rectangular.

Examples 

Semi-circular half towers
 Bergerschanzturm in Aachen, Germany
 Endingerturm in Rapperswil, Switzerland
 Haldenturm in Rapperswil
 Karlsturm in Aachen
 Schildturm in Aachen
 Dover Castle, Kent, England
 Framlingham Castle, Suffolk, England
 Orford Castle, Suffolk, England (possible)
 Wehrturm am Gänsbühl in Ravensburg, Germany

City or town wall towers
 Dinkelsbühl, Germany
 Bad Hersfeld, Germany
 Einbeck, Germany
 Freiburg im Üechtland, Switzerland

Rectangular half towers
 Krichelenturm in Aachen
 Schänzchen in Aachen
 Porte d'Orange in Carpentras, France

Town wall towers in
 Payerne, Switzerland
 Ston, Croatia
 Głogów, Poland
 Avignon and Aigues-Mortes (illustrated)

References

Literature 
  (Online version, pdf, 6.61MB)

External links 

City walls
Fortified towers by type
Types of gates
Castle architecture